Alfred John Keeling (14 December 1920 – 1 December 1942) was an English professional footballer who played as a forward.

Career
Keeling was born in Bradford, and spent his early career with Carlton Street School, Sedbergh and East Bierley. He joined Bradford Park Avenue in 1936, playing with the reserves before signing a professional contract on 14 December 1937, his seventeenth birthday. Pugh made his debut in the Football League for them on 26 March 1938, and after a brief spell with Portsmouth, he joined Manchester City in May 1939. Pugh's career was interrupted by World War Two, and he played as a war guest for Bradford City, Manchester City and Bradford Park Avenue. 

Keeling later joined the Royal Air Force and was shot down over the Bay of Biscay on 1 December 1942.

References

1920 births
1942 deaths
English footballers
Bradford (Park Avenue) A.F.C. players
Portsmouth F.C. players
Manchester City F.C. players
Bradford City A.F.C. players
English Football League players
Royal Air Force Volunteer Reserve personnel of World War II
Royal Air Force  personnel killed in World War II
Association football forwards
Military personnel from Bradford
Aviators killed by being shot down